Frederic Arthur Morgan (May 15, 1846October 2, 1925) was an American farmer and Republican politician.  He was a member of the Wisconsin State Assembly, representing Oshkosh in the 1871 session.  He was one of the first members of the Wisconsin Legislature to have been born in the territory of Wisconsin.

Background 
Morgan was born May 15, 1846, in the town of Pewaukee, in Waukesha County, Wisconsin Territory.  He attended public school, including some time at the high school in Fond du Lac. He moved with his parents to Black Wolf, Winnebago County, in 1851. During the American Civil War, he served as a private in Company I of the 39th Wisconsin Infantry Regiment.  The 39th Wisconsin Infantry was a "100 day" regiment, with its members mustering into service in May 1864, and mustering out in September 1864.

Public office  
Morgan was a member of the town board of supervisors, of which he was elected chairman in 1868 and re-elected in 1869. In 1870, he was elected to the 3rd Winnebago County Assembly district (the Towns of Black Wolf, Nekimi, Nepeuskin, Omro, Poygan, Rushford, and Utica) for the 24th Wisconsin Legislature as a Republican, with 1,142 votes, against 69 write-ins (Republican incumbent James H. Foster was running for the Wisconsin Senate, and there was no Democratic or third party nominee). Morgan was the youngest member of the Assembly during that session. He was assigned to the standing committees on the militia and on contingent expenditures.  After the legislature was redistricted, most of the old 3rd Winnebago County district was assigned to a new 4th District, which would be represented in 1872 by Republican Alson Wood. Black Wolf and Omro remained in a drastically revised 3rd District, which would go to Democrat Nelson Beckwith. Morgan was not a candidate for either district.

Electoral history

Wisconsin Assembly (1870)

| colspan="6" style="text-align:center;background-color: #e9e9e9;"| General Election, November 8, 1870

References 

1846 births
1925 deaths
People from Winnebago County, Wisconsin
Farmers from Wisconsin
Wisconsin city council members
People of Wisconsin in the American Civil War
Union Army soldiers
19th-century American politicians
Republican Party members of the Wisconsin State Assembly